Tithraustes moerens is a moth of the family Notodontidae. It is found in the forest understory along forest trails and streambeds in the Andean foothills of western Ecuador, reaching southern Colombia.

Larvae have been recorded feeding on an unidentified understory palm.

References

Moths described in 1900
Notodontidae of South America